The 2008 UAB Blazers football team represented the University of Alabama at Birmingham (UAB) in the 2008 NCAA Division I FBS football season. The Blazers' head coach was Neil Callaway, who entered his second year at UAB. They played their home games at Legion Field in Birmingham, Alabama and competed in the East Division of Conference USA (C-USA). They improved upon a 2–10 record from the 2007 season and finished the 2008 campaign with an overall record of 4–8 (3–5 C-USA).

All games were broadcast live on the UAB-ISP Sports radio network.  The flagship was WWMM 100.5 FM in Birmingham, and this marked the first season for it serving as the flagship.  The games were called by David Crane (play-by-play) and Jake Arians (color commentary), with Pat Green and Dan Burks as field reporters.  Other UAB radio programming was carried on WJOX 94.5 FM.  The team did not have a local TV contract, but their games appeared nationally on cable television five times—one on Raycom Sports, two on CSS, and two on CBS College Sports (formerly CSTV).

Preseason

Recruiting
In what was the second recruiting class for head coach Neil Callaway, UAB signed 25 recruits.

Schedule

Personnel

Roster

Coaching staff
 Neil Callaway – head coach
 Kim Helton – Offensive coordinator/tight ends
 Eric Schumann – Defensive coordinator/safeties
 Corey Barlow – Cornerbacks
 Tim Bowens – Receivers
 Lorenzo Costantini – Defensive line
 Steve Davenport – Running backs
 Will Friend – Offensive line
 Tyson Helton – Quarterbacks/recruiting coordinator
 Tyson Summers – Linebackers
 Steve martin – Strength and Conditioning/Football & Baseball
 Ervin lewis – Director of Football Operations

Game Summaries

Tulsa

The Blazers began their season at home against Golden Hurricane of Tulsa, but after taking a 13–7 lead after the first would fall by a final score of 45–22. UAB would score first on a 32-yard touchdown pass from Joe Webb to Frantell Forrest. Tulsa would respond with a 10-yard David Johnson pass to Jacob Collums, only to have UAB take a 13–7 lead on a 9-yard Jeffery Anderson touchdown reception. Tulsa would respond with a pair of consecutive touchdowns in the second to take a 21–13 lead before Forrest returned a kickoff 90-yards for a touchdown to bring the score to 21–19. A late 32-yard Swayze Waters field goal would give the Blazers a 22–21 halftime lead. However, UAB would not score again for the afternoon and lose by a final score of 45–22.

Florida Atlantic

The Blazers first road game of the 2008 season took UAB to Ft. Lauderdale, where they would lose too the FAU Owls in a 49–34 shootout. After going down 14–0 on a pair of FAU touchdown passes, UAB would score its first points on a 27-yard Swayze Waters field goal. The Owls would answer with a touchdown run early in the second in taking a 21–3 lead only to see the blazers respond with a pair of Joe Webb touchdown passes, 20-yards to Zach Lankford and 19-yards to Frantell Forrest, in closing the gap to 21–17. However, FAU would score once more before the half in taking a 28–17 halftime lead.

The Blazers would open the third by scoring on a 2-yard Aaron Johns run only to see the Owls once again respond with another touchdown. After a late 43-yard Waters field goal in the third, UAB's final points would come in the fourth on a 10-yard Justin Brooks touchdown run.

Tennessee

Traveling to Knoxville to face the Volunteers, all the Blazers could manage was a single 47-yard Swayze Waters field goal in the third to avoid the shutout in this 35–3 defeat. For the game, UAB was outgained on offense 275 to 548 total yards.

Alabama State

The Blazers would amass 486 yards of total offense in winning their first game of the 2008 season with a 44–10 victory over the Hornets of Alabama State. UAB would strike first on a 41-yard Joe Web run with the Hornets responding in kind on a 39-yard Rei Herchenbach touchdown pass to Darius Mathis in tying the game at 7–7 midway through the first quarter. The Blazers would regain the lead late in the first quarter, and never relinquish it again on a 24-yard Webb touchdown pass to Jeffery Anderson. In the second, the Blazers would add another pair of touchdowns on an 11-yard Rashaud Slaughter run and a 36-yard Webb pass to Anderson in taking a 28–7 halftime lead.

UAB would continue to amass points in the third on another pair of touchdowns coming on a 6-yard Slaughter run and 15-yard Justin Brooks run in extending their lead to 42–7 entering the fourth. In the fourth, each team would exchange a pair of field goals in bringing the final score to 45–10. For the game, Joe Webb would rush for 121 yards and a touchdown and pass for 238 yards and a pair of touchdowns.

South Carolina

Traveling to face their second SEC opponent on the 2008 season, the Blazers were defeated 26–13 by the home Gamecocks in Columbia. After only connecting on a pair of Swayze Waters field goals in the first half, the Blazers lone touchdown came late in the fourth on a 1-yard Joe Webb run.

Memphis

In the annual Battle for the Bones, Memphis defeated UAB 30–33 on a Thursday night in Birmingham. The Blazers would get on the board in the first after Joe Webb connected with Mike Jones for a 16-yard touchdown reception, followed with an 18-yard Swayze Waters field goal to give the Blazers a 10–0 lead entering the second quarter. After Memphis scored early in the second, UAB would respond with a 9-yard Webb run to take a 16–7 lead. However this would be UAB's final lead of the evening as Memphis would score another pair of touchdowns in taking a 20–16 lead at the half. In the second half, Webb would score on runs of 12 and 10-yards in the third and fourth quarters respectively, but were unable to take the lead in falling by a final score of 30–33. For the game, Webb rushed for 93 yards and three touchdowns in addition to passing for 235 yards and another touchdown for the evening.

Houston

In the first conference road game of the 2008 season, the Blazers would fall 20–45 at Houston. UAB would dominate the first half in taking a 20–3 lead going into the half. The Blazer would score on a pair of Swayze Waters field goals (50 and 23 yards respectively) and on a 3-yard Joe Webb touchdown run and a 21-yard, Zach Lankford touchdown reception. However, 42 unanswered Cougar points in the second half would provide Houston the 45–20 victory.

Marshall

Southern Miss

The Blazers were out-rushed 96 to 463 total yards in this 70–14 blowout loss on the road to the Golden Eagles. After going down 28–0 after the first, UAB would score their first points on a 14-yard Joe Webb touchdown pass to Rashaud Slaughter early in the second. The Blazers only other points would come in the third on a 12-yard Mario Wright touchdown reception. For the game, the Golden Eagles out-gained the Blazers in total offense by a final margin of 610 to 223 yards, with both USM's Tory Harrison and V.J. Floyd each gaining over 100 yards on the ground.

Tulane

Following a bye week, the Blazers would make the trip to the Superdome and emerge with a 41–24 victory over the home Green Wave.

East Carolina

This 17–13 Pirates victory marked the first all-time win for East Carolina in Legion Field against the Blazers.

UCF

Statistics

Team

Scores by quarter

Offense

Rushing

Passing

Receiving

Defense

Special teams
KickingPunting<div style="float:left; width:100%;">

References

UAB
UAB Blazers football seasons
UAB Blazers football